Elections were held in Lennox and Addington County, Ontario on October 22, 2018 in conjunction with municipal elections across the province.

Lennox and Addington County Council
The County Council consists of the three municipal reeves, mayor of Greater Napanee and the three deputy reeves and the Deputy Reeve of Greater Napanee.

Addington Highlands

Greater Napanee

Loyalist

Stone Mills

References

Lennox
Lennox and Addington County